Justine Hastings is an American economist, academic, and policy advisor, who serves as Professor of Economics and International and Public Affairs at Brown University, and as a research associate with the National Bureau of Economic Research. Her research focuses on combining economics and big data to solve social problems, spanning topics across education policy, retirement policy, household finance, marketing, competition, antitrust, and environmental regulation.

Hastings also served on the Academic Research Council for the United States Consumer Financial Protection Bureau (CFPB), and on the Council of Economic Advisors to the Governor of Rhode Island. She has served as a managing editor for the International Journal of Industrial Organization, and as co-editor of the Journal of Public Economics. She has also advised state and federal agencies in matters related to antitrust, energy and environmental regulation.

She started in Dec 2020 at Amazon as its VP and is in charge of PXTCS (People Experience and Technology Central Science) team. It's reported in Dec 2022 that she has been investigated by the company for creating a toxic work environment.

Education 
Hastings holds a PhD in Economics from the University of California, Berkeley.

Bibliography

References 

Year of birth missing (living people)
Living people
American economists
American women economists
Brown University faculty
University of California, Berkeley alumni
21st-century American women